This is a list of women writers who were born in Malaysia or whose writings are closely associated with that country.

A
Suriani Abdullah (1924–2013), historian, memoirist
Adibah Amin (born 1936), novelist, playwright, columnist, translator
Wani Ardy (born 1984), poet, songwriter
Che Husna Azhari (born 1955), short story writer, educator

B 
Fatimah Busu (born 1943), novelist, short story writer, critic, educator

C
Bernice Chauly, artist, photographer, poet, novelist, organiser of Georgetown Literary Festival for a number of years.
Zen Cho (born 1986), bestselling fantasy novelist and short story writer
Yangsze Choo, fourth generation Malaysian writer, of Chinese descent, best-selling international novelist.
Chuah Guat Eng (born 1943), English-language novelist

F
Shamini Flint, bestselling mystery novelist of the Inspector Singh series.

G
Dulcie Gray (1915–2011), Malaysian-born British actress, novelist, playwright

H
Khadijah Hashim (born 1942), novelist, short story writer, children's writer, poet
Ho Sok Fong, Malaysian Chinese short story writer

I
Siti Zainon Ismail (born 1949), novelist, short story writer, poet, educator

J
Khasnor Johan, historian, since 1974: non-fiction writer

K
Shih-Li Kow (born 1968), short story writer

L
Margaret Lim (1947-2011), children's writer

M
Rani Manicka, since 2003, best selling novelist
Salmi Manja, pen name of Saleha binti Abdul Rashid (born 1937), novelist, short story writer, poet, journalist

S
Anis Sabirin, short story writer and essayist
Preeta Samarasan, since early 2000s, English-language short story writer, novelist
Azalia Suhaimi (born 1985), poet, photographer

T
Hilary Tham (1946–2005), Malaysian-American poet, memoirist, short story writer

Y
Felicia Yap, bestselling mystery novelist

Z
Dina Zaman (1969), short story writer, essayist, columnist

See also
List of women writers

References

-
Malaysian
Writers
Writers, women